Lazar Enev Marin (born 9 February 1994) is a Bulgarian professional footballer who currently plays as a defender for CSKA 1948 Sofia.

Career

Early career
Marin began his career at the Spartak Plovdiv academy but moved to Botev Plovdiv along with Radoslav Terziev, Lachezar Angelov and Rosen Andonov in January 2012. In February 2013, he joined Rakovski on loan to gain first team experience. In June 2014, Marin was recalled by his parent club after spending a one-and-a-half-years with Rakovski and making 34 league appearances.

Botev Plovdiv

2014-15 season
On 7 December 2014 Lazar Marin was included in the starting lineup as a left defender during the 2-0 win over PFC Haskovo. A week later he played again 90 minutes and made a solid performance during the 1-0 loss from Ludogorets Razgrad.

On 15 March 2015 Marin participated in the final 30 minutes during the important 2-0 home win of Botev Plovdiv over CSKA Sofia. He came on as a substitute for Momchil Tsvetanov and played on the atypical for him position of a left midfielder. A week later, on 22 March, Marin again came on as a substitute and again played on the same position during the 0-0 draw with Ludogorets Razgrad.

On 18 April Lazar Marin was included in the starting lineup for the 1-1 draw with Beroe Stara Zagora. He played well but was replaced on the half time due to an injury.

On 3 May 2015 Marin came on a substitute and made an assist for the goal of Tomáš Jirsák during the 1-3 defeat from Ludogorets Razgrad.

Soon after Petar Penchev decided to start using Lazar Marin in more attacking role he scored his first goal in A grupa. On 16 May Marin opened the score with a right footed shot, although he prefers to play with the left foot, during the 3-2 win over CSKA Sofia. In the same game Marin also provided an assist to Ivan Tsvetkov. A week later, on 23 May, Marin scored again but this time Botev Plovdiv lost with 1-2 the away game versus Beroe Stara Zagora.

2015-16 season
Lazar Marin established as a regular first team player for Botev Plovdiv during 2015-16 season. He participated in all of the first 10 matches in A Grupa and received 5 yellow cards. He missed the 11th round due to a ban.
In the beginning of 2016, after the arrival of Ihor Oshchypko, Marin lost his regular place in the starting line-up. On 6 March, he came on as a substitute during the 1-1 away draw with Beroe Stara Zagora.

On 24 April Lazar Marin was in the starting line-up and scored a goal during the 1-2 defeat from Lokomotiv Plovdiv. Five days later, on 29 April, Marin was in the starting line-up during the 2-2 draw with PFC Pirin Blagoevgrad.

Return to Botev 

In January 2017, Marin returned to Botev Plovdiv as a free agent. On 18 February, he made his debut after the come back during the 1-0 away win over Lokomotiv Gorna Oryahovitsa.

On 24 May 2017 Lazar Marin played an important role in the historical 2-1 win over Ludogorets Razgrad in the Bulgarian Cup final and won the cup with Botev Plovdiv.

Torpedo Kutaisi
On 1 July 2018, Marin signed a one year contract with Georgian club Torpedo Kutaisi.

International career

Under 21 
On 31 March 2015 Marin played for Bulgaria U21 during their 1-3 away defeat against Wales U21.

On 21 May 2016 Marin was in the starting lineup during the 0-1 defeat from France U21.

Career statistics

Honours
Botev Plovdiv
Bulgarian Cup: 2016–17
Bulgarian Supercup: 2017

Torpedo Kutaisi
Georgian Cup: 2018

References

External links
 
 

1994 births
Living people
People from Plovdiv Province
Bulgarian footballers
Bulgaria youth international footballers
Bulgaria under-21 international footballers
Association football fullbacks
First Professional Football League (Bulgaria) players
Second Professional Football League (Bulgaria) players
Erovnuli Liga players
Botev Plovdiv players
PFC CSKA Sofia players
FC Torpedo Kutaisi players
FC CSKA 1948 Sofia players
Bulgarian expatriate footballers
Bulgarian expatriate sportspeople in Georgia (country)
Expatriate footballers in Georgia (country)